RANS or Rans may refer to:

rANS, an entropy coding technique
Rans, Jura, a commune in eastern France
Rans (Penafiel), a parish in the municipality of Penafiel, northern Portugal
 RANS Cilegon F.C., an Indonesian football club
Rans Designs, an aircraft, sail trike, land yacht and bicycle manufacturer, usually styled as "RANS" by the company
Reynolds-averaged Navier–Stokes equations